Acheron Island is one of the islands south of the Great Palm Island group. The island is halfway between Magnetic Island and Great Palm Island.

The island is just north of Rattlesnake Island, where the RAAF practices bombing raids. Possibly (covered up by SQN 3 Co WC Brown, at the time) the site of an accidental practice bombing with a Mk84 500 lb bomb by a RAAF FA-18 flown by a RAF exchange pilot in 1997. Four campers were on the island and a large fire was started. Other nearby islands are Herald Island, Bramble Island and Cordelia Rocks.

Climate

See also 
 List of islands of Australia

References

Uninhabited islands of Australia
Islands on the Great Barrier Reef